While There's War There's Hope is a 1974 satirical Commedia all'italiana film written, directed and starring Alberto Sordi. The film's success in Italy led to its title becoming a proverb.

Plot  
Pietro Chiocca (Alberto Sordi) is an Italian retailer, who sells hydraulic pumps. He realizes he will make money only if he starts selling weapons to poor Third World countries. Soon he becomes a millionaire and can afford to offer his family a comfortable lifestyle with villas, jewels, a swimming pool, and other luxuries. Nobody knows anything about his real business. Unexpectedly, a journalist discovers Pietro's job, and describes it in an indignant article. Both family and friends feel ashamed. Then Pietro, in a shrewd speech, tells his kin that the splendor of the family's life is due precisely to his own peculiar business. If they want, he adds, he can stop selling weapons immediately, but then the family has to return to the previous (much more modest) lifestyle. He tells them he will go to bed to rest because the next day, he will need to get up early to return to his job. They can choose to let him sleep and stop trading arms or wake him early and accept his trade. In the end scene, he is awakened by the waitress earlier than he requested on the instruction of his family.

Cast 
Alberto Sordi as Pietro Chiocca
Silvia Monti as Silvia, Pietro's wife
Alessandro Cutolo as Pietro's Uncle
 Matilde Costa Giuffrida  as Pietro's Mother-in-law 
 Edoardo Faieta  as Gutierrez 
 Mauro Firmani  as Dicky 
 Eliana De Santis  as Giada 
  Sergio Puppo  as Balcazar  
 Roy Bosier  as Rabal
 Samuel Cummings as Himself

References

External links
 

Italian comedy films
Italian satirical films
Commedia all'italiana
1973 comedy films
1973 films
Films directed by Alberto Sordi
Films scored by Piero Piccioni
Films about arms trafficking
Films set in France
Films set in Milan
Films shot in Senegal
1970s Italian films